Andrew Delaplaine (born November 16, 1949, in Coconut Grove, FL) is an American novelist, screenwriter, director, and producer.

Biography
In 1987 Delaplaine moved to South Beach Miami and, with his sister Renee, opened Scratch, one of a handful of white tablecloth restaurants in what was then a slum area of Miami. Behind Scratch, he launched an Equity theater as well as a black box nightclub called Backscratch.

In 1989 Delaplaine (along with his sister Renee) opened the Warsaw Ballroom, which quickly became one of the most outlandish gay nightclubs in the U.S.

In 1991 he launched Wire, a weekly newspaper modeled on Andy Warhol's Interview. He edited and published Wire for 10 years before selling the magazine to focus on his other writing. It is still the longest running weekly editorial published on South Beach.

In 1994, since no one else had filed to run against incumbent Mayor Seymour Gelber, thus insuring a situation where issues would never be debated, Delaplaine ran for mayor, but lost.

Films
He has produced, written or directed several shorts and feature films.

Among these was the Malcolm Mowbray directed film Meeting Spencer"'  for which he and his co-writers won "Best Screenwriting" award at the 2014 Milan International Film Festival.Meeting Spencer'' starred Golden Globe and Emmy Award winner Jeffrey Tambor.

References

External links

  Berkeley Video & Film Fest website
  MIFF Film Festival website

1949 births
Living people
American male writers
American screenwriters